Great Harwood is a town in the Hyndburn district of Lancashire, England, located  north east of Blackburn and adjacent to the Ribble Valley. Great Harwood is the major conurbation of the 'Three Towns'; the three towns being Great Harwood, Clayton-le-Moors, and Rishton. In 2001, the town had a population of 11,220, which decreased to 10,800 at the census of 2011.

History

Great Harwood is a town with an industrial heritage. The Mercer Hall Leisure Centre in Queen Street, and the town clock, pay tribute to John Mercer (1791–1866), the 'father' of Great Harwood, who revolutionised the cotton dyeing process with his invention of mercerisation. The cotton industry became the main source of employment in the town, and by 1920, the Great Harwood Weavers' Association had more than 5,000 members.

The town was once on the railway line from Blackburn to Burnley via Padiham – The North Lancs or Great Harwood Loop of the Lancashire and Yorkshire Railway. The last passenger train ran in November 1957 and goods traffic in 1964. The Martholme Viaduct on the line remains about one mile north east.

Public transport links were further curtailed in 2016, when the direct bus link to Manchester was axed by Harrogate based Transdev.

Great Harwood used to have a lively and bustling market around the town clock in the main square.

Great Harwood has three supermarkets: Aldi, which opened in November 2010, Tesco, which opened in December 2011, and Morrisons, which was previously Co-Op, which originally opened in June 2001, which also opened in 2010. There are two petrol stations, run by Texaco, as well as Morrisons.

In July 2016, Domino's Pizza announced plans to open in Great Harwood, as well as Accrington.

A retained fire station is also located in the town, having opened in 1972.

Sports

The town football team, Great Harwood Town, closed in July 2006.
Great Harwood Cricket Club, was a member of the Ribblesdale Cricket League, winning the senior division in 2008, and has seven teams, ranging from under-9s through to senior level. In 2016, the club accepted an invitation from the Lancashire League, and played in that league from the season of 2017.

In 1954, and again in 1957, the Great Harwood team won the Roller Hockey National Cup.

Events
Great Harwood is also home to Great Harwood Agricultural Show, an annual show, established in 1857 and held on Spring Bank Holiday Monday. It moved to its present site at the junction of Harwood Lane and Whalley Road in 2009.

Notable people
 Thomas Birtwistle (1833–1912), trade unionist and factory inspector, born at Great Harwood.
 Matthew Derbyshire,  professional footballer with Blackburn Rovers, Olympiacos, Nottingham Forest and Rotherham United.
 David Dunn, footballer, was born and brought up in Great Harwood. He initially played for Blackburn Rovers, but moved to Birmingham City in August 2003. In January 2007, he moved back to Blackburn Rovers.
 Leslie Duxbury (1926–2005), Coronation Street scriptwriter, was a resident.
 Nicholas Freeston (1907–1978), award winning Lancashire poet, who worked at Birtwistle and Fielding's, Delph Road Mill, Great Harwood.
 Michael Gibson, television presenter director, was brought up in Great Harwood.
 Mortimer Grimshaw (1824/5–1869), strike leader and political activist
 Ethel Carnie Holdsworth (1886–1962), writer, also published as Ethel Carnie and Ethel Holdsworth, lived in Great Harwood until her marriage in 1915, and some of her poems and novels were written in the town.
 Netherwood Hughes (1900–2009), World War I veteran, was born in Lord Street.
 Mick Jackson, writer, best known for his novel of 1997 The Underground Man, was born in the town in 1960.
 John Mercer, scientist who developed a process for treating cotton, was born in the town in 1791.
 Brett Ormerod, footballer, Great Harwood born and bred. Grew up on Duke Street.

See also
Listed buildings in Great Harwood
St John's Church, Great Harwood

References

External links
Local history site with many photos
Great Harwood Community Website

 
Towns in Lancashire
Unparished areas in Lancashire
Geography of Hyndburn